Mile Milovac (born May 5, 1965) was an American soccer goalkeeper who was drafted by D.C. United in the 1996 MLS Inaugural Player Draft.  He played for United Serbs in Chicago’s Metropolitan Soccer League as well as in the Continental Indoor Soccer League and Premier Development League.

Milovac played for the United Serbes in Chicago’s Metropolitan Soccer League.  In February 1996, D.C. United drafted Milovac in the seventh round (70th overall) of the 1996 MLS Inaugural Player Draft.  The team waived him on April 16, 1996.  He then played the 1996 summer indoor season with the Indianapolis Twisters in the Continental Indoor Soccer League.  On September 30, 1996, the Indiana Blast of the USISL D3-Pro League.

He currently owns a fireplace construction and repair company in Indianapolis, Indiana.

References

1965 births
Living people
American soccer players
Association football goalkeepers
Continental Indoor Soccer League players
Indiana Blast players
Indiana Twisters players
USL League Two players